Zoom TV may refer to:

 Zoom (Israeli TV channel)
 Zoom (Ukrainian TV channel)
 Zoom (Indian TV channel)
 Zoom TV (Poland)